This is an incomplete list of Acts of the Parliament of the United Kingdom for the years 1900–1919.  Note that the first parliament of the United Kingdom was held in 1801; parliaments between 1707 and 1800 were either parliaments of Great Britain or of Ireland).  For Acts passed up until 1707 see List of Acts of the Parliament of England and List of Acts of the Parliament of Scotland.  For Acts passed from 1707 to 1800 see List of Acts of the Parliament of Great Britain.  See also the List of Acts of the Parliament of Ireland.

For Acts of the devolved parliaments and assemblies in the United Kingdom, see the List of Acts of the Scottish Parliament, the List of Acts of the Northern Ireland Assembly, and the List of Acts and Measures of the National Assembly for Wales; see also the List of Acts of the Parliament of Northern Ireland.

The number shown after each Act's title is its chapter number. Acts passed before 1963 are cited using this number, preceded by the year(s) of the reign during which the relevant parliamentary session was held; thus the Union with Ireland Act 1800 is cited as "39 & 40 Geo. 3 c. 67", meaning the 67th Act passed during the session that started in the 39th year of the reign of George III and which finished in the 40th year of that reign.  Note that the modern convention is to use Arabic numerals in citations (thus "41 Geo. 3" rather than "41 Geo. III"). Acts of the last session of the Parliament of Great Britain and the first session of the Parliament of the United Kingdom are both cited as "41 Geo. 3".  Acts passed from 1963 onwards are simply cited by calendar year and chapter number.

1900–1909

1900

63 & 64 Vict.

 Agricultural Holdings Act 1900 c. 50
 Ancient Monuments Protection Act 1900 c. 34
 Appropriation Act 1900 c. 57
 Army (Annual) Act 1900 c. 5
 Beer Retailers' and Spirit Grocers' Retail Licences (Ireland) Act 1900 c. 30
 Burial Act 1900 c. 15
 Census (Great Britain) Act 1900 c. 4
 Census (Ireland) Act 1900 c. 6
 Charitable Loan Societies (Ireland) Act 1900 c. 25
 Colonial Solicitors Act 1900 c. 14
 Colonial Stock Act 1900 c. 62
 Commonwealth of Australia Constitution Act 1900 c. 12 (note that the short title as given in the Act itself omits the year)
 Companies Act 1900 c. 48
 Consolidated Fund (No. 1) Act 1900 c. 1
 Consolidated Fund (No. 2) Act 1900 c. 3
 County Councils (Elections) Amendment Act 1900 c. 13
 County Courts (Investment) Act 1900 c. 47
 County Surveyors (Ireland) Act 1900 c. 18
 District Councillors and Guardians (Term of Office) Act 1900 c. 16
 Ecclesiastical Assessments (Scotland) Act 1900 c. 20
 Electoral Disabilities (Military Service) Removal Act 1900 c. 8
 Elementary Education Act 1900 c. 53
 Elementary School Teachers Superannuation (Isle of Man) Act 1900 c. 38
 Elementary School Teachers Superannuation (Jersey) Act 1900 c. 40
 Executors (Scotland) Act 1900 c. 55
 Expiring Laws Continuance Act 1900 c. 37
 Exportation of Arms Act 1900 c. 44
 Finance Act 1900 c. 7
 Housing of the Working Classes Act 1900 c. 59
 Inebriates Amendment (Scotland) Act 1900 c. 28
 Intermediate Education (Ireland) Act 1900 c. 43
 Isle of Man (Customs) Act 1900 c. 31
 Land Charges Act 1900 c. 26
 Land Registry (New Buildings) Act 1900 c. 19
 Local Government (Ireland) Act 1900 c. 63
 Local Government (Ireland) (No. 2) Act 1900 c. 41
 London County Council Electors Qualification Act 1900 c. 29
 Lunacy Board (Scotland) Salaries and Clerks Act 1900 c. 54
 Members of Local Authorities Relief Act 1900 c. 46
 Merchant Shipping (Liability of Shipowners and others) Act 1900 c. 32
 Military Lands Act 1900 c. 56
 Mines (Prohibition of Child Labour Underground) Act 1900 c. 21
 Money-lenders Act 1900 c. 51
 Naval Reserve Act 1900 c. 52
 Naval Reserve (Mobilisation) Act 1900 c. 17
 Oil in Tobacco Act 1900 c. 35
 Police Reservists (Allowances) Act 1900 c. 9
 Poor Relief (Ireland) Act 1900 c. 45
 Poor Removal Act 1900 c. 23
 Public Health (Ireland) Act 1900 c. 10
 Public Works Loans Act 1900 c. 36
 Railway Employment (Prevention of Accidents) Act 1900 c. 27
 Reserve Forces Act 1900 c. 42
 Supplemental War Loan Act 1900 c. 61
 Tithe Rentcharge (Ireland) Act 1900 c. 58
 Town Councils (Scotland) Act 1900 c. 49
 Tramways (Ireland) Act 1900 c. 60
 Uganda Railway Act 1900 c. 11
 Veterinary Surgeons Amendment Act 1900 c. 24
 Volunteer Act 1900 c. 39
 War Loan Act 1900 c. 2
 Wild Animals in Captivity Protection Act 1900 c. 33
 Workmen's Compensation Act 1900 c. 22

64 Vict. Sess. 2

 Appropriation Act 1900, Session 2 c. 2
 Supplemental War Loan (No. 2) Act 1900 c. 1

1901 (1 Edw. 7) 

 Agricultural Rates Act 1896, &c., Continuance Act 1901 c. 13
 Appropriation Act 1901 c. 21
 Army (Annual) Act 1901 c. 2
 Births and Deaths Registration Act 1901 c. 26
 Burgh Sewerage, Drainage and Water Supply (Scotland) Act 1901 c. 24
 Civil List Act 1901 c. 4
 Colonial Acts Confirmation Act 1901 c. 29
 Congested Districts Board (Ireland) Act 1901 c. 34
 Consolidated Fund Act (No. 1), 1901 c. 1
 Consolidated Fund (No. 2) Act 1901 c. 6
 Demise of the Crown Act 1901 c. 5
 East India Loan (Great Indian Peninsula Railway Debentures) Act 1901 c. 25
 Education Act 1901 c. 11
 Education (Scotland) Act 1901 c. 9
 Expiring Laws Continuance Act 1901 c. 33
 Factory and Workshop Act 1901 c. 22
 Finance Act 1901 c. 7
 Fisheries (Ireland) Act 1901 c. 38
 Intoxicating Liquors (Sale to Children) Act 1901 c. 27
 Isle of Man (Customs) Act 1901 c. 32
 Isolation Hospitals Act 1901 c. 8
 Larceny Act 1901 c. 10
 Light Railway Commissioners (Salaries) Act 1901 c. 36
 Loan Act 1901 c. 12
 Local Government (Ireland) Act 1901 c. 28
 Lunacy (Ireland) Act 1901 c. 17
 Marriages Legalization Act 1901 c. 23
 Military Works Act 1901 c. 40
 Militia and Yeomanry Act 1901 c. 14
 National Gallery (Purchase of Adjacent Land) Act 1901 c. 16
 Naval Works Act 1901 c. 39
 Pacific Cable Act 1901 c. 31
 Patents Act 1901 c. 18
 Public Libraries Act 1901 c. 19
 Public Works Loans Act 1901 c. 35
 Purchase of Land (Ireland) Act 1901 c. 3
 Purchase of Land (Ireland) (No. 2) Act 1901 c. 30
 Royal Titles Act 1901 c. 15
 Valuation (Ireland) Act 1901 c. 37
 Youthful Offenders Act 1901 c. 20

1902 (2 Edw. 7) 

 Agriculture and Technical Instruction (Ireland) Act 1902 c. 3
 Agriculture and Technical Instruction (Ireland) (No. 2) Act 1902 c. 33
 Appropriation Act 1902 c. 27
 Appropriation (No. 2) Act 1902 c. 30
 Army (Annual) Act 1902 c. 2
 British Museum Act 1902 c. 12
 Consolidated Fund (No. 1) Act 1902 c. 1
 Cremation Act 1902 c. 8
 Education Act 1901, (Renewal) Act 1902 c. 19
 Education Act 1902 c. 42
 Electric Lighting (Scotland) Act 1902 c. 35
 Expiring Laws Continuance Act 1902 c. 32
 Finance Act 1902 c. 7
 Freshwater Fish (Scotland) Act 1902 c. 29
 Immoral Traffic (Scotland) Act 1902 c. 11
 Isle of Man (Customs) Act 1902 c. 23
 Labour Bureaux (London) Act 1902 c. 13
 Lands Valuation (Scotland) Amendment Act 1902 c. 25
 Licensing Act 1902 c. 28
 Licensing (Ireland) Act 1902 c. 18
 Loan Act 1902 c. 4
 Local Government (Ireland) Act 1902 c. 38
 Mail Ships Act 1902 c. 36
 Marine Works (Ireland) Act 1902 c. 24
 Metropolis Water Act 1902 c. 41
 Midwives Act 1902 c. 17
 Militia and Yeomanry Act 1902 c. 39
 Musical (Summary Proceedings) Copyright Act 1902 c. 15
 Osborne Estate Act 1902 c. 37
 Pacific Cable (Amendment) Act 1902 c. 26
 Patents Act 1902 c. 34
 Pauper Children (Ireland) Act 1902 c. 16
 Police Reservists Act 1902 c. 10
 Prison Officers (Pensions) Act 1902 c. 9
 Public Libraries (Ireland) Act 1902 c. 20
 Public Works Loans Act 1902 c. 22
 Royal Naval Reserve Act 1902 c. 5
 Shop Clubs Act 1902 c. 21
 Supreme Court of Judicature Act 1902 c. 31
 Uganda Railway Act 1902 c. 40
 University of Wales Act 1902 c. 14
 Wild Birds Protection Act 1902 c. 6

1903 (3 Edw. 7) 

 Appropriation Act 1903 c. 32
 Army (Annual) Act 1903 c. 4
 Bank Holiday (Ireland) Act 1903 c. 1
 Berwickshire County Town Act 1903 c. 5
 Board of Agriculture and Fisheries Act 1903 c. 31
 Borough Funds Act 1903 c. 14
 Burgh Police (Scotland) Act 1903 c. 33
 Coal Mines Regulation Act (1887) Amendment Act 1903 c. 7
 Consolidated Fund (No. 1) Act 1903 c. 3
 Contracts (India Office) Act 1903 c. 11
 County Councils (Bills in Parliament) Act 1903 c. 9
 County Courts Act 1903 c. 42
 Diseases of Animals Act 1903 c. 43
 Dublin Improvement (Bull Alley Area) Act
 Education (London) Act 1903 c. 24
 Education (Provision of Working Balances) Act 1903 c. 10
 Elementary Education Amendment Act 1903 c. 13
 Employment of Children Act 1903 c. 45
 Expiring Laws Continuance Act 1903 c. 40
 Finance Act 1903 c. 8
 General Dealers (Ireland) Act 1903 c. 44
 Housing of the Working Classes Act 1903 c. 39
 Ireland Development Grant Act 1903 c. 23
 Isle of Man (Customs) Act 1903 c. 35
 Land Purchase (Ireland) Act 1903 c. 37
 Licensing (Scotland) Act 1903 c. 25
 Light Locomotives (Ireland) Act 1903 c. 2
 Local Government (Transfer of Powers) Act 1903 c. 15
 Marriages Legalization Act 1903 c. 26
 Metropolitan Streets Act 1903 c. 17
 Military Lands Act 1903 c. 47
 Military Works Act 1903 c. 29
 Motor Car Act 1903 c. 36
 Naval Forces Act 1903 c. 6
 Naval Works Act 1903 c. 22
 Patriotic Fund Reorganisation Act 1903 c. 20
 Pistols Act 1903 c. 18
 Poor Law (Dissolution of School Districts and Adjustments) Act 1903 c. 19
 Poor Prisoners' Defence Act 1903 c. 38
 Post Office (Money Orders) Act 1903 c. 12
 Public Buildings Expenses Act 1903 c. 41
 Public Offices Site (Dublin) Act 1903 c. 16
 Public Works Loans Act 1903 c. 28
 Railways (Electrical Power) Act 1903 c. 30
 Revenue Act 1903 c. 46
 South African Loan and War Contribution Act 1903 c. 27
 Sugar Convention Act 1903 c. 21
 Town Councils (Scotland) Act 1903 c. 34

1904  (4 Edw. 7)

 Anglo-French Convention Act 1904 c. 33
 Appropriation Act 1904 c. 17
 Army (Annual) Act 1904 c. 5
 Bishoprics of Southwark and Birmingham Act 1904 c. 30
 Capital Expenditure (Money) Act 1904 c. 21
 Consolidated Fund (No. 1) Act 1904 c. 1
 Cunard Agreement (Money) Act 1904 c. 22
 Education (Local Authority Default) Act 1904 c. 18
 Expiring Laws Continuance Act 1904 c. 29
 Finance Act 1904 c. 7
 Hall-marking of Foreign Plate Act 1904 c. 6
 Indian Councils Act 1904 c. 26
 Irish Land Act 1904 c. 34
 Isle of Man (Customs) Act 1904 c. 25
 Leeds University Act 1904 c. 12
 Licensing Act 1904 c. 23
 London Electric Lighting Areas Act 1904 c. 13
 Metropolitan Improvements (Funds) Act 1904 c. 2
 Outdoor Relief (Friendly Societies) Act 1904 c. 32
 Poor Law Authorities (Transfer of Property) Act 1904 c. 20
 Post Office Act 1904 c. 14
 Prevention of Cruelty to Children Act 1904 c. 15
 Prisons (Scotland) Act 1904 c. 35
 Public Health Act 1904 c. 16
 Public Works Loans Act 1904 c. 36
 Railways (Private Sidings) Act 1904 c. 19
 Registration of Clubs (Ireland) Act 1904 c. 9
 Savings Banks Act 1904 c. 8
 Secretary for Scotland Act 1904 c. 27
 Shop Hours Act 1904 c. 31
 Telegraph (Money) Act 1904 c. 3
 University of Liverpool Act 1904 c. 11
 Weights and Measures Act 1904 c. 28
 Wild Birds Protection Act 1904 c. 4
 Wild Birds Protection (St. Kilda) Act 1904 c. 10
 Wireless Telegraphy Act 1904 c. 24

1905 (5 Edw. 7) 

 Agricultural Rates Act 1896, &c., Continuance Act 1905 c. 8
 Aliens Act 1905 c. 13
 Appropriation Act 1905 c. 17
 Army (Annual) Act 1905 c. 2
 Churches (Scotland) Act 1905 c. 12
 Coal Mines (Weighing of Minerals) Act 1905 c. 9
 Consolidated Fund (No. 1) Act 1905 c. 1
 Consolidated Fund (No. 2) Act 1905 c. 6
 East India Loans (Railways) Act 1905 c. 19
 Expiring Laws Continuance Act 1905 c. 21
 Finance Act 1905 c. 4
 Isle of Man (Customs) Act 1905 c. 16
 Licensing (Ireland) Act 1905 c. 3
 Medical Act (1886) Amendment Act 1905 c. 14
 Mr. Speaker's Retirement Act 1905 c. 5
 Naval Works Act 1905 c. 20
 Provisional Order (Marriages) Act 1905 c. 23
 Public Works Loans Act 1905 c. 22
 Railway Fires Act 1905 c. 11
 Shipowners' Negligence (Remedies) Act 1905 c. 10
 Trade Marks Act 1905 c. 15
 Unemployed Workmen Act 1905 c. 18
 War Stores (Commission) Act 1905 c. 7

1906 (6 Edw. 7)

Public General Acts
 Agricultural Holdings Act 1906 c. 56
 Alkali, &c. Works Regulation Act 1906 c. 14
 Appropriation Act 1906 c. 26
 Army (Annual) Act 1906 c. 2
 Bills of Exchange (Crossed Cheques) Act 1906 c. 17
 Burial Act 1906 c. 44
 Census of Production Act 1906 c. 49
 Charitable Loan Societies (Ireland) Act 1906 c. 23
 Colonial Marriages (Deceased Wife's Sister) Act 1906 c. 30
 Consolidated Fund (No. 1) Act 1906 c. 1
 Crown Lands Act 1906 c. 28
 Deanery of Manchester Act 1906 c. 19
 Dogs Act 1906 c. 32
 Education (Provision of Meals) Act 1906 c. 57
 Education of Defective Children (Scotland) Act 1906 c. 10
 Expiring Laws Continuance Act 1906 c. 51
 Extradition Act 1906 c. 15
 Fatal Accidents and Sudden Deaths Inquiry (Scotland) Act 1906 c. 35
 Fertilisers and Feeding Stuffs Act 1906 c. 27
 Finance Act 1906 c. 8
 Ground Game (Amendment) Act 1906 c. 21
 Indian Railways Act Amendment Act 1906 c. 9
 Intoxicating Liquors (Ireland) Act 1906 c. 39
 Isle of Man (Customs) Act 1906 c. 18
 Justices of the Peace Act 1906 c. 16
 Labourers (Ireland) Act 1906 c. 37
 Land Tax Commissioners Act 1906 c. 52
 Licensing Act 1906 c. 42
 Local Authorities (Treasury Powers) Act 1906 c. 33
 Local Government (Ireland) Act (1898) Amendment Act 1906 c. 31
 Marine Insurance Act 1906 c. 41
 Marriage with Foreigners Act 1906 c. 40
 Merchant Shipping Act 1906 c. 48
 Metropolitan Police (Commission) Act 1906 c. 6
 Municipal Corporations Amendment Act 1906 c. 12
 Musical Copyright Act 1906 c. 36
 National Galleries of Scotland Act 1906 c. 50
 Notice of Accidents Act 1906 c. 53
 Open Spaces Act 1906 c. 25
 Police (Superannuation) Act 1906 c. 7
 Post Office (Literature for the Blind) Act 1906 c. 22
 Post Office (Money Orders) Act 1906 c. 4
 Prevention of Corruption Act 1906 c. 34
 Public Trustee Act 1906 c. 55
 Public Works Loans Act 1906 c. 29
 Recorders, Stipendiary Magistrates, and Clerks of the Peace Act 1906 c. 46
 Removal of Offensive Matter Act 1906 c. 45
 Reserve Forces Act 1906 c. 11
 Revenue Act 1906 c. 20
 Seamen's and Soldiers' False Characters Act 1906 c. 5
 Seed Potatoes Supply (Ireland) Act 1906 c. 3
 Solicitors Act 1906 c. 24
 Statute Law Revision (Scotland) Act 1906 c. 38
 Street Betting Act 1906 c. 43
 Town Tenants (Ireland) Act 1906 c. 54
 Trade Disputes Act 1906 c. 47
 Wireless Telegraphy Act 1906 c. 13
 Workmen's Compensation Act 1906 c. 58

Local Acts
 Dean Forest Act 1906 c. cxix

1907 (7 Edw. 7) 

 Advertisements Regulation Act 1907 c. 27
 Appropriation Act 1907 c. 20
 Army (Annual) Act 1907 c. 2
 Assay of Imported Watch-Cases (Existing Stocks Exemption) Act 1907 c. 8
 Australian States Constitution Act 1907 c. 7
 British North America Act 1907 c. 11 (known in Canada as the Constitution Act, 1907)
 Butter and Margarine Act 1907 c. 21
 Commissioners for Oaths (Prize Proceedings) Act 1907 c. 25
 Companies Act 1907 c. 50
 Consolidated Fund (No. 1) Act 1907 c. 1
 Council of India Act 1907 c. 35
 Criminal Appeal Act 1907 c. 23
 Deceased Wife's Sister's Marriage Act 1907 c. 47
 Destructive Insects and Pests Act 1907 c. 4
 Education (Administrative Provisions) Act 1907 c. 43
 Employers' Liability Insurance Companies Act 1907 c. 46
 Employment of Women Act 1907 c. 10
 Evicted Tenants (Ireland) Act 1907 c. 56
 Evidence (Colonial Statutes) Act 1907 c. 16
 Expiring Laws Continuance Act 1907 c. 34
 Factory and Workshop Act 1907 c. 39
 Finance Act 1907 c. 13
 Injured Animals Act 1907 c. 5
 Irish Land Act 1907 c. 38
 Irish Tobacco Act 1907 c. 3
 Isle of Man (Customs) Act 1907 c. 26
 Lights on Vehicles Act 1907 c. 45
 Limited Partnerships Act 1907 c. 24
 London Cab and Stage Carriage Act 1907 c. 55
 Married Women's Property Act 1907 c. 18
 Matrimonial Causes Act 1907 c. 12
 Merchant Shipping Act 1907 c. 52
 Notification of Births Act 1907 c. 40
 Patents and Designs Act 1907 c. 29
 Patents and Designs (Amendment) Act 1907 c. 28
 Petty Sessions Clerk (Ireland) Amendment Act 1907 c. 22
 Prisons (Ireland) Act 1907 c. 19
 Probation of Offenders Act 1907 c. 17
 Public Health (Regulations as to Food) Act 1907 c. 32
 Public Health (Scotland) Amendment Act 1907 c. 30
 Public Health Acts Amendment Act 1907 c. 53
 Public Works Loans Act 1907 c. 36
 Qualification of Women (County and Borough Councils) Act 1907 c. 33
 Qualification of Women (County and Town Councils) (Scotland) Act 1907 c. 48
 Released Persons (Poor Law Relief) Act 1907 c. 14
 Salmon and Freshwater Fisheries Act 1907 c. 15
 Sea Fisheries (Scotland) Application of Penalties Act 1907 c. 42
 Sheriff Courts (Scotland) Act 1907 c. 51
 Small Holdings and Allotments Act 1907 c. 54
 Supreme Court of Judicature (Ireland) Act 1907 c. 44
 Telegraph (Money) Act 1907 c. 6
 Territorial and Reserve Forces Act 1907 c. 9
 Transvaal Loan (Guarantee) Act 1907 c. 37
 Vaccination Act 1907 c. 31
 Vaccination (Scotland) Act 1907 c. 49
 Whale Fisheries (Scotland) Act 1907 c. 41

1908 (8 Edw. 7) 

 Agricultural Holdings Act 1908 c. 28
 Agricultural Holdings (Scotland) Act 1908 c. 64
 Appellate Jurisdiction Act 1908 c. 51
 Appropriation Act 1908 c. 30
 Army (Annual) Act 1908 c. 2
 Assizes and Quarter Sessions Act 1908 c. 41
 Bee Pest Prevention (Ireland) Act 1908 c. 34
 Children Act 1908 c. 67
 Coal Mines Regulation Act 1908 c. 57
 Commons Act 1908 c. 44
 Companies Act 1908 c. 12
 Companies (Consolidation) Act 1908 c. 69
 Consolidated Fund (No. 1) Act 1908 c. 1
 Constabulary (Ireland) Act 1908 c. 60
 Coroners (Ireland) Act 1908 c. 37
 Costs in Criminal Cases Act 1908 c. 15
 Cran Measures Act 1908 c. 17
 Criminal Appeal (Amendment) Act 1908 c. 46
 Crofters Common Grazings Regulation Act 1908 c. 50
 East India Loans Act 1908 c. 54
 Education (Scotland) Act 1908 c. 63
 Endowed Schools (Masters) Act 1908 c. 39
 Evicted Tenants (Ireland) Act 1908 c. 22
 Expiring Laws Continuance Act 1908 c. 18
 Fatal Accidents (Damages) Act 1908 c. 7
 Finance Act 1908 c. 16
 Friendly Societies Act 1908 c. 32
 Grand Jury (Ireland) Act 1836, Amendment Act 1908 c. 29
 Housing of the Working Classes (Ireland) Act 1908 c. 61
 Irish Universities Act 1908 c. 38
 Isle of Man (Customs) Act 1908 c. 9
 Law of Distress Amendment Act 1908 c. 53
 Local Authorities (Admission of the Press to Meetings) Act 1908 c. 43
 Local Government (Scotland) Act 1908 c. 62
 Local Registration of Title (Ireland) Amendment Act 1908 c. 58
 Lunacy Act 1908 c. 47
 Married Women's Property Act 1908 c. 27
 Naval Lands (Volunteers) Act 1908 c. 25
 Naval Marriages Act 1908 c. 26
 Old Age Pensions Act 1908 c. 40
 Patents and Designs Act 1908 c. 4
 Poisons and Pharmacy Act 1908 c. 55
 Police (Superannuation) Act 1908 c. 5
 Polling Arrangements (Parliamentary Boroughs) Act 1908 c. 14
 Polling Districts (County Councils) Act 1908 c. 13
 Polling Districts and Registration of Voters (Ireland) Act 1908 c. 35
 Port of London Act 1908 c. 68
 Post Office Act 1908 c. 48
 Post Office Savings Bank Act 1908 c. 8
 Post Office Savings Bank (Public Trustee) Act 1908 c. 52
 Prevention of Crime Act 1908 c. 59
 Prosecution of Offences Act 1908 c. 3
 Public Health Act 1908 c. 6
 Public Meeting Act 1908 c. 66
 Public Works Loans Act 1908 c. 23
 Punishment of Incest Act 1908 c. 45
 Registration Act 1908 c. 21
 Seed Potatoes and Seed Oats Supply (Ireland) Act 1908 c. 19
 Small Holdings and Allotments Act 1908 c. 36
 Statute Law Revision Act 1908 c. 49
 Summary Jurisdiction (Ireland) Act 1908 c. 24
 Summary Jurisdiction (Scotland) Act 1908 c. 65
 Telegraph (Construction) Act 1908 c. 33
 Tobacco Growing (Scotland) Act 1908 c. 10
 Tuberculosis Prevention (Ireland) Act 1908 c. 56
 University of Durham Act 1908 c. 20
 Whale Fisheries (Ireland) Act 1908 c. 31
 White Phosphorus Matches Prohibition Act 1908 c. 42
 Wild Birds Protection Act 1908 c. 11

1909 (9 Edw. 7) 

 Appropriation Act 1909 c. 5
 Army (Annual) Act 1909 c. 3
 Assistant Postmaster-General Act 1909 c. 14
 Assurance Companies Act 1909 c. 49
 Asylums Officers' Superannuation Act 1909 c. 48
 Board of Agriculture and Fisheries Act 1909 c. 15
 Board of Trade Act 1909 c. 23
 Cinematograph Act 1909 c. 30
 Colonial Naval Defence Act 1909 c. 19
 Consolidated Fund (No. 1) Act 1909 c. 1
 Consolidated Fund (No. 2) Act 1909 c. 2
 County Councils Mortgages Act 1909 c. 38
 Development and Road Improvement Funds Act 1909 c. 47
 Diseases of Animals Act 1909 c. 26
 Education (Administrative Provisions) Act 1909 c. 29
Electric Lighting Act 1909 c. 34
 Expiring Laws Continuance Act 1909 c. 46
 Fisheries (Ireland) Act 1909 c. 25
 Health Resorts and Watering-Places (Ireland) Act 1909 c. 32
 Housing, Town Planning, &c. Act 1909 c. 44
 Indian Councils Act 1909 c. 4
 Irish Handloom Weavers Act 1909 c. 21
 Irish Land Act 1909 c. 42
 Isle of Man (Customs) Act 1909 c. 45
 Judicature (Rule Committee) Act 1909 c. 11
 Labour Exchanges Act 1909 c. 7
 Local Education Authorities (Medical Treatment) Act 1909 c. 13
 Local Registration of Title (Ireland) Act 1909 c. 36
 Marine Insurance (Gambling Policies) Act 1909 c. 12
 Merchandise Marks (Ireland) Act 1909 c. 24
 Metropolitan Ambulances Act 1909 c. 17
 Motor Car (International Circulation) Act 1909 c. 37
 Naval Discipline Act 1909 c. 41
 Naval Establishments in British Possessions Act 1909 c. 18
 Oaths Act 1909 c. 39
 Police (Liverpool Inquiry) Act 1909 c. 35
 Police Act 1909 c. 40
 Prisons (Scotland) Act 1909 c. 27
 Public Works Loans Act 1909 c. 6
 Revenue Act 1909 c. 43
 South Africa Act 1909 c. 9
 Summary Jurisdiction (Scotland) Act 1908, Amendment Act 1909 c. 28
 Superannuation Act 1909 c. 10
 Telegraph (Arbitration) Act 1909 c. 20
 Trade Boards Act 1909 c. 22
 Trawling in Prohibited Areas Prevention Act 1909 c. 8
 Weeds and Agricultural Seeds (Ireland) Act 1909 c. 31
 Wild Animals in Captivity Protection (Scotland) Act 1909 c. 33
 Workmen's Compensation (Anglo-French Convention) Act 1909 c. 16

1910–1919

1910 (10 Edw. 7 & 1 Geo. 5) 

 Accession Declaration Act 1910 c. 29
 Agricultural Holdings (Scotland) Amendment Act 1910 c. 30
 Ancient Monuments Protection Act 1910 c. 3
 Appropriation Act 1910 c. 14
 Appropriation (No. 2) Act 1910 c. 38
 Army (Annual) Act 1910 c. 6
 Census (Great Britain) Act 1910 c. 27
 Census (Ireland) Act 1910 c. 11
 Children Act (1908) Amendment Act 1910 c. 25
 Civil List Act 1910 c. 28
 Companies (Converted Societies) Act 1910 c. 23
 Consolidated Fund (No. 1) Act 1910 c. 4
 Consolidated Fund (No. 2) Act 1910 c. 9
 County Common Juries Act 1910 c. 17
 Development and Road Improvement Funds Act 1910 c. 7
 Diseases of Animals Act 1910 c. 20
 Duke of York's School (Chapel) Act 1910 c. 16
 East India Loans (Railways and Irrigation) Act 1910 c. 5
 Education (Choice of Employment) Act 1910 c. 37
 Expiring Laws Continuance Act 1910 c. 36
 Finance (1909-10) Act 1910 c. 8
 Finance Act 1910 c. 35
 Hotels and Restaurants (Dublin) Act 1910 c. 33
 Isle of Man (Customs) Act 1910 c. 18
 Jury Trials Amendment (Scotland) Act 1910 c. 31
 Licensing (Consolidation) Act 1910 c. 24
 Mines Accidents (Rescue and Aid) Act 1910 c. 15
 Municipal Corporations Amendment Act 1910 c. 19
 Police (Scotland) Act (1890) Amendment Act 1910 c. 10
 Police (Weekly Rest-Day) Act 1910 c. 13
 Public Works Loans Act 1910 c. 21
 Regency Act 1910 c. 26
 Registration of Births, Deaths and Marriages (Scotland) Amendment Act 1910 c. 32
 Small Holdings Act 1910 c. 34
 Supreme Court of Judicature Act 1910 c. 12
 Treasury (Temporary Borrowing) Act 1910 c. 1
 Trusts (Scotland) Act 1910 c. 22
 War Loan (Redemption) Act 1910 c. 2

1911 (1 & 2 Geo. 5)

Public General Acts
 Aerial Navigation Act 1911 c. 4
 Appropriation Act 1911 c. 15
 Army (Annual) Act 1911 c. 3
 Burgh Police (Scotland) Amendment Act 1911 c. 51
 Coal Mines Act 1911 c. 50
 Consolidated Fund (No. 1) Act 1911 c. 1
 Consolidated Fund (No. 2) Act 1911 c. 5
 Conveyancing Act 1911 c. 37
 Copyright Act 1911 c. 46
 Education (Administrative Provisions) Act 1911 c. 32
 Expiring Laws Continuance Act 1911 c. 22
 Factory and Workshop (Cotton Cloth Factories) Act 1911 c. 21
 Finance Act 1911 c. 48
 Geneva Convention Act 1911 c. 20
 Government of India Act Amendment Act 1911 c. 25
 House Letting and Rating (Scotland) Act 1911 c. 53
 Indian High Courts Act 1911 c. 18
 Intestate Husband's Estate (Scotland) Act 1911 c. 10
 Isle of Man (Customs) Act 1911 c. 14
 Isle of Man Harbours Act 1911 c. 33
 Labourers (Ireland) Act 1911 c. 19
 Local Authorities (Ireland) (Qualification of Women) Act 1911 c. 35
 Lunacy Act 1911 c. 40
 Maritime Conventions Act 1911 c. 57
 Merchandise Marks Act 1911 c. 31
 Merchant Shipping (Seamen's Allotment) Act 1911 c. 8
 Merchant Shipping (Stevedores and Trimmers) Act 1911 c. 41
 Merchant Shipping Act 1911 c. 42
 Military Manoeuvres Act 1911 c. 44
 Money-lenders Act 1911 c. 38
 Municipal Elections (Corrupt and Illegal Practicers) Act 1911 c. 7
 National Gallery and St. James's Park Act 1911 c. 23
 National Insurance Act 1911 c. 55
 Naval Discipline (Dominion Naval Forces) Act 1911 c. 47
 Official Secrets Act 1911 c. 28
 Old Age Pensions Act 1911 c. 16
 Pacific Cable Act 1911 c. 36
 Parliament Act 1911 c. 13
 Parsonages Act 1911 c. 29
 Pensions (Governors of Dominions &c.) Act 1911 c. 24
 Perjury Act 1911 c. 6
 Poultry Act 1911 c. 11
 Protection of Animals Act 1911 c. 27
 Public Health (Ireland) Act 1911 c. 12
 Public Health (Scotland) Act (1897) Amendment Act 1911 c. 30
 Public Libraries (Art Galleries in County Boroughs) (Ireland) Act 1911 c. 9
 Public Roads (Ireland) Act 1911 c. 45
 Public Works Loans Act 1911 c. 17
 Rag Flock Act 1911 c. 52
 Railway Companies (Accounts and Returns) Act 1911 c. 34
 Resident Magistrates (Belfast) Act 1911 c. 58
 Revenue Act 1911 c. 2
 Shops Act 1911 c. 54
 Small Landholders (Scotland) Act 1911 c. 49
 Telegraph (Construction) Act 1911 c. 39
 Telephone Transfer Act 1911 c. 26
 Telephone Transfer Amendment Act 1911 c. 56
 University of Wales (Medical Graduates) Act 1911 c. 43

Local Acts
 Lloyd's Act 1911 c. lxii
 Salford Hundred Court of Record Act 1911 c. clxxii

1912 (2 & 3 Geo. 5) 

 Appropriation Act 1912 c. 7
 Army (Annual) Act 1912 c. 5
 Coal Mines (Minimum Wage) Act 1912 c. 2
 Consolidated Fund (No. 1) Act 1912 c. 1
 Criminal Law Amendment Act 1912 c. 20
 Elementary School Teachers (Superannuation) Act 1912 c. 12
 Expiring Laws Continuance Act 1912 c. 18
 Finance Act 1912 c. 8
 Government of India Act 1912 c. 6
 Isle of Man (Customs) Act 1912 c. 9
 Light Railways Act 1912 c. 19
 London Institution (Transfer) Act 1912 c. 13
 Marriages in Japan (Validity) Act 1912 c. 15
 Metropolitan Police Act 1912 c. 4
 Protection of Animals (Scotland) Act 1912 c. 14
 Protection of Animals Act (1911) Amendment Act 1912 c. 17
 Public Works Loans Act 1912 c. 11
 Royal Scottish Museum (Extension) Act 1912 c. 16
 Seal Fisheries (North Pacific) Act 1912 c. 10
 Shops Act 1912 c. 3

1913 (3 & 4 Geo. 5)

Public General Acts
 Aerial Navigation Act 1913 c. 22
 Agricultural Holdings Act 1913 c. 21
 Ancient Monuments Consolidation and Amendment Act 1913 c. 32
 Appellate Jurisdiction Act 1913 c. 21
 Appropriation (1912-3) Act 1913 c. 27
 Appropriation Act 1913 c. 35
 Army (Annual) Act 1913 c. 2
 Bankruptcy (Scotland) Act 1913 c. 20
 Bankruptcy and Deeds of Arrangement Act 1913 c. 34
 Bishoprics of Sheffield, Chelmsford, and for the County of Suffolk Act 1913 c. 36
 Children (Employment Abroad) Act 1913 c. 7
 Clerks of Session (Scotland) Regulation Act 1913 c. 23
 Companies Act 1913 c. 25
 Consolidated Fund (No. 1) Act 1913 c. 1
 Consolidated Fund (No. 2) Act 1913 c. 5
 Crown Lands Act 1913 c. 8
 Education (Scotland) Act 1913 c. 12
 Education (Scotland) (Glasgow Electoral Divisions) Act 1913 c. 13
 Expiring Laws Continuance Act 1913 c. 15
 Extension of Polling Hours Act 1913 c. 6
 Fabrics (Misdescription) Act 1913 c. 17
 Finance Act 1913 c. 30
 Foreign Jurisdiction Act 1913 c. 16
 Forgery Act 1913 c. 27
 Government of the Soudan Loan Act 1913 c. 10
 Herring Fishery (Branding) Act 1913 c. 9
 Highlands and Islands (Medical Service) Grant Act 1913 c. 26
 Industrial and Provident Societies (Amendment) Act 1913 c. 31
 Intermediate Education (Ireland) Act 1913 c. 29
 Isle of Man (Customs) Act 1913 c. 18
 Local Government (Adjustments) Act 1913 c. 19
 Mental Deficiency Act 1913 c. 28
 Mental Deficiency and Lunacy (Scotland) Act 1913 c. 38
 National Insurance Act 1913 c. 37
 Pensions (Governors of Dominions, &c.) Amendment Act 1913 c. 26
 Pilotage Act 1913 c. 31
 Post Office Act 1913 c. 11
 Prisoners (Temporary Discharge for Ill-health) Act 1913 c. 4
 Provisional Collection of Taxes Act 1913 c. 3
 Public Buildings Expenses Act 1913 c. 14
 Public Health (Prevention and Treatment of Disease) Act 1913 c. 23
 Public Works Loans Act 1913 c. 22
 Railway and Canal Traffic Act 1913 c. 29
 Sheriff Courts (Scotland) Act 1913 c. 28
 Shops Act 1913 c. 24
 Telegraph (Money) Act 1913 c. 24
 Temperance (Scotland) Act 1913 c. 33
 Trade Union Act 1913 c. 30
 Tuberculosis Prevention (Ireland) Act 1913 c. 25

Local Acts
 Ascot Authority Act 1913 c.lxxxiv

1914

4 & 5 Geo. 5

 Affiliation Orders Act 1914 c. 6
 Agricultural Holdings Act 1914 c. 7
 Aliens Restriction Act 1914 c. 12
 Anglo-Persian Oil Company (Acquisition of Capital) Act 1914 c. 37
 Appropriation Act 1914 c. 24
 Army (Annual) Act 1914 c. 2
 Army (Supply of Food, Forage, and Stores) Act 1914 c. 26
 Army Pensions Act 1914 c. 83
 Articles of Commerce (Returns, &c.) Act 1914 c. 65
 Bankruptcy Act 1914 c. 59
 Bills of Exchange Act 1914 c. 82
 British Nationality and Status of Aliens Act 1914 c. 17
 Charitable Trusts Act 1914 c. 56
 Coal Mines Act 1914 c. 22
 Consolidated Fund (No. 1) Act 1914 c. 1
 Constabulary and Police (Ireland) Act 1914 c. 54
 County and Borough Councils (Qualification) Act 1914 c. 21
 County, Town, and Parish Councils (Qualification) (Scotland) Act 1914 c. 39
 Courts (Emergency Powers) Act 1914 c. 78
 Criminal Justice Administration Act 1914 c. 58
 Currency and Bank Notes Act 1914 c. 14
 Currency and Bank Notes (Amendment) Act 1914 c. 72
 Customs (Exportation Prohibition) Act 1914 c. 64
 Death Duties (Killed in War) Act 1914 c. 76
 Deeds of Arrangement Act 1914 c. 47
 Defence of the Realm Act 1914 c. 29
 Defence of the Realm (No. 2) Act 1914 c. 63
 Diseases of Animals (Ireland) Act 1914 c. 40
 East African Protectorates (Loans) Act 1914 c. 38
 Education (Provision of Meals) Act 1914 c. 20
 Education (Provision of Meals) (Ireland) Act 1914 c. 35
 Education (Scotland) (Provision of Meals) Act 1914 c. 68
 Education (Scotland) (War Service Superannuation) Act 1914 c. 67
 Electoral Disabilities (Naval and Military Service) Removal Act 1914 c. 25
 Elementary Education (Defective and Epileptic Children) Act 1914 c. 45
 Elementary School Teachers (War Service Superannuation) Act 1914 c. 66
 Entail (Scotland) Act 1914 c. 43
 Expiring Laws Continuance Act 1914 c. 23
 Exportation of Horses Act 1914 c. 15
 Feudal Casualties (Scotland) Act 1914 c. 48
 Finance Act 1914 c. 10
 Government of Ireland Act 1914 c. 90
 Government of the Soudan Loan Act 1914 c. 9
 Grey Seals Protection Act 1914 c. 3
 Housing Act 1914 c. 31
 Housing (No. 2) Act 1914 c. 52
 Housing (No. 2) (Amendment) Act 1914 c. 71
 Injuries in War (Compensation) Act 1914 c. 30
 Intermediate Education (Ireland) Act 1914 c. 41
 Intoxicating Liquor (Temporary Restriction) Act 1914 c. 77
 Irish Police Constables (Naval and Military Service) Act 1914 c. 84
 Isle of Man (Customs) Act 1914 c. 19
 Isle of Man (War Legislation) Act 1914 c. 62
 Labourers (Ireland) Act 1914 c. 32
 Local Government (Adjustments) (Scotland) Act 1914 c. 74
 Mall Approach (Improvement) Act 1914 c. 28
 Merchant Shipping (Certificates) Act 1914 c. 42
 Merchant Shipping (Convention) Act 1914 c. 50
 Metropolitan Police (Employment in Scotland) Act 1914 c. 44
 Milk and Dairies Act 1914 c. 49
 Milk and Dairies (Scotland) Act 1914 c. 46
 National Insurance (Navy and Army) Act 1914 c. 81
 National Insurance (Part II. Amendment) Act 1914 c. 57
 Naval Billeting, &c. Act 1914 c. 70
 Navy (Pledging of Certificates, &c.) Act 1914 c. 89
 Osborne Estate Act 1914 c. 36
 Patents and Designs Act 1914 c. 18
 Patents, Designs, and Trade Marks (Temporary Rules) Act 1914 c. 27
 Patents, Designs, and Trade Marks Temporary Rules (Amendment) Act 1914 c. 73
 Police (Scotland) (Limit of Age) Act 1914 c. 69
 Police (Weekly Rest-Day) (Scotland) Act 1914 c. 8
 Police Constables (Naval and Military Service) Act 1914 c. 80
 Police Reservists (Allowances) Act 1914 c. 34
 Postponement of Payments Act 1914 c. 11
 Prize Courts (Egypt, Zanzibar, and Cyprus) Act 1914 c. 79
 Prize Courts (Procedure) Act 1914 c. 13
 Public Works Loans Act 1914 c. 33
 Rates (Proceedings for Recovery) Act 1914 c. 85
 River Navigation Improvement (Ireland) Act 1914 c. 55
 Sheffield University Act 1914 c. 4
 Slaughter of Animals Act 1914 c. 75
 Special Constables Act 1914 c. 61
 Special Constables (Scotland) Act 1914 c. 53
 Superannuation Act 1914 c. 86
 Superannuation (Ecclesiastical Commissioners and Queen Anne's Bounty) Act 1914 c. 5
 Suspensory Act 1914 c. 88
 Trade Marks Act 1914 c. 16
 Trading with the Enemy Act 1914 c. 87
 Unreasonable Withholding of Food Supplies Act 1914 c. 51
 War Loan Act 1914 c. 60
 Welsh Church Act 1914 c. 91

5 & 6 Geo. 5

 Anglo-Portuguese Commercial Treaty Act 1914 c. 1
 Consolidated Fund (No. 1) Act 1914 (Session 2) c. 6
 Courts (Emergency Powers) (Ireland) Act 1914 c. 19
 Criminal Justice Administration (Postponement) Act 1914 c. 9
 Customs (Exportation Restriction) Act 1914 c. 2
 Defence of the Realm Consolidation Act 1914 c. 8
 Execution of Trusts (War Facilities) Act 1914 c. 13
 Finance Act 1914 (Session 2) c. 7
 Government War Obligations Act 1914 c. 11
 House of Commons (Commissions in His Majesty's Forces) Act 1914 c. 3
 Injuries in War Compensation Act 1914 (Session 2) c. 18
 Land Drainage Act 1914 c. 4
 Law Agents Apprenticeship (War Service) (Scotland) Act 1914 c. 20
 Local Authorities (Disqualification Relief) Act 1914 c. 10
 National Insurance (Navy and Army) Act 1914 (Session 2) c. 15
 Navy and Marines (Wills) Act 1914 c. 17
 Poor Relief (Ireland) Act 1914 c. 14
 Royal Marines Act 1914 c. 16
 Sheriff Courts (Scotland) Amendment Act 1914 c. 5
 Trading with the Enemy Amendment Act 1914 c. 12

1915 (5 & 6 Geo. 5)

 American Loan Act 1915 c. 81
 Appropriation Act 1915 c. 77
 Appropriation (No. 2) Act 1915 c. 86
 Army (Amendment) Act 1915 c. 26
 Army (Amendment) No. 2 Act 1915 c. 58
 Army (Annual) Act 1915 c. 25
 Army (Suspension of Sentences) Act 1915 c. 23
 Army (Transfers) Act 1915 c. 43
 British North America Act 1915 c. 45 (known in Canada as the Constitution Act, 1915)
 British Ships (Transfer Restriction) Act 1915 c. 21
 Clubs (Temporary Provisions) Act 1915 c. 84
 Consolidated Fund (No. 2) Act 1915 c. 33
 Consolidated Fund (No. 3) Act 1915 c. 53
 Consolidated Fund (No. 4) Act 1915 c. 80
 Copyright (British Museum) Act 1915 c. 38
 Cotton Associations (Emergency Action) Act 1915 c. 69
 Customs (Exportation Restriction) Act 1915 c. 52
 Customs (War Powers) Act 1915 c. 31
 Customs (War Powers) (No. 2) Act 1915 c. 71
 Defence of the Realm (Amendment) Act 1915 c. 34
 Defence of the Realm (Amendment), No. 2, Act 1915 c. 37
 Defence of the Realm (Amendment) (No. 3) Act 1915 c. 42
 Education (Small Population Grants) Act 1915 c. 95
 Elections and Registration Act 1915 c. 76
 Evidence (Amendment) Act 1915 c. 94
 Execution of Trusts (War Facilities) Amendment Act 1915 c. 70
 Expiring Laws Continuance Act 1915 c. 63
 Finance Act 1915 c. 62
 Finance (No. 2) Act 1915 c. 89
 Fishery Harbours Act 1915 c. 48
 Fugitive Offenders (Protected States) Act 1915 c. 39
 Government of India Act 1915 c. 61
 Government War Obligations Act 1915 c. 96
 Housing (Rosyth Dockyard) Act 1915 c. 49
 Immature Spirits (Restriction) Act 1915 c. 46
 Increase of Rent and Mortgage Interest (War Restrictions) Act 1915 c. 97
 Indian Civil Service (Temporary Provisions) Act 1915 c. 87
 Indictments Act 1915 c. 90
 Injuries in War (Compensation) Act 1915 c. 24
 Irish Police (Naval and Military Service) Act 1915 c. 32
 Isle of Man (Customs) Act 1915 c. 67
 Judicial Committee Act 1915 c. 92
 Legal Proceedings against Enemies Act 1915 c. 36
 Maintenance of Live Stock Act 1915 c. 65
 Marriage of British Subjects (Facilities) Act 1915 c. 40
 Midwives (Scotland) Act 1915 c. 91
 Milk and Dairies (Consolidation) Act 1915 c. 66
 Milk and Dairies Acts Postponement Act 1915 c. 59
 Ministry of Munitions Act 1915 c. 51
 Munitions of War Act 1915 c. 54
 National Insurance (Part I. Amendment) Act 1915 c. 29
 National Insurance (Part II. Amendment) Act 1915 c. 27
 National Registration Act 1915 c. 60
 Naval Discipline Act 1915 c. 30
 Naval Discipline (No. 2) Act 1915 c. 73
 Naval Marriages Act 1915 c. 35
 Naval Medical Compassionate Fund Act 1915 c. 28
 Naval and Military War Pensions, &c., Act 1915 c. 83
 Notification of Births (Extension) Act 1915 c. 64
 Patents and Designs Act (Partial Suspension) Act 1915 c. 85
 Police (Emergency Provisions) Act 1915 c. 41
 Police Magistrates (Superannuation) Act 1915 c. 74
 Post Office and Telegraph Act 1915 c. 82
 Price of Coal (Limitation) Act 1915 c. 75
 Prize Courts Act 1915 c. 57
 Public Works Loans Act 1915 c. 68
 Re-election of Ministers Act 1915 c. 50
 Scottish Universities (Emergency Powers) Act 1915 c. 78
 Special Acts (Extension of Time) Act 1915 c. 72
 Special Constables (Scotland) Act 1915 c. 47
 Statutory Companies (Redeemable Stock) Act 1915 c. 44
 Street Collections Regulation (Scotland) Act 1915 c. 88
 Trading with the Enemy (Extension of Powers) Act 1915 c. 98
 Trading with the Enemy Amendment Act 1915 c. 79
 Universities and Colleges (Emergency Powers) Act 1915 c. 22
 War Loan Act 1915 c. 55
 War Loan (Supplemental Provisions) Act 1915 c. 93
 War Loan (Trustees) Act 1915 c. 56

1916

5 & 6 Geo. 5

 Army (Suspension of Sentences) Amendment Act 1916 c. 103
 Customs (War Powers) Act 1916 c. 102
 Military Service Act 1916 c. 104
 Munitions of War (Amendment) Act 1916 c. 99
 Naval Forces (Service on Shore) Act 1916 c. 101
 Parliament and Registration Act 1916 c. 100
 Trading with the Enemy Amendment Act 1916 c. 105

6 & 7 Geo. 5

 Anglo-Portuguese Commercial Treaty Act 1916 c. 39
 "Anzac" (Restriction on Trade Use of Word) Act 1916 c. 51
 Appropriation Act 1916 c. 71
 Army (Annual) Act 1916 c. 5
 Army (Courts of Inquiry) Act 1916 c. 33
 Arrest of Suspected Persons (Ireland) Act 1916 c. 63
 British North America Act, 1916 c. 19
 British Ships (Transfer Restriction) Act 1916 c. 42
 Consolidated Fund (No. 1) Act 1916 c. 1
 Consolidated Fund (No. 2) Act 1916 c. 3
 Consolidated Fund (No. 3) Act 1916 c. 16
 Consolidated Fund (No. 4) Act 1916 c. 30
 Consolidated Fund (No. 5) Act 1916 c. 48
 Constabulary and Police (Ireland) Act 1916 c. 59
 Court of Session (Extracts) Act 1916 c. 49
 Courts (Emergency Powers) (Amendment) Act 1916 c. 13
 Courts (Emergency Powers) (No. 2) Act 1916 c. 18
 Defence of the Realm (Acquisition of Land) Act 1916 c. 63
 Dublin Reconstruction (Emergency Provisions) Act 1916 c. 66
 Education (Provision of Meals) (Ireland) Act 1916 c. 10
 Elementary Education (Fee Grant) Act 1916 c. 35
 Expiring Laws Continuance Act 1916 c. 29
 Finance Act 1916 c. 24
 Finance (Exchequer Bonds) Amendment Act 1916 c. 36
 Finance (New Duties) Act 1916 c. 11
 Friendly Societies Act 1916 c. 54
 Gas (Standard of Calorific Power) Act 1916 c. 25
 Government of India (Amendment) Act 1916 c. 37
 Government War Obligations Act 1916 c. 70
 Imperial Institute (Management) Act 1916 c. 8
 Isle of Man (Customs) Act 1916 c. 27
 Larceny Act 1916 c. 50
 Law and Procedure (Emergency Provisions) (Ireland) Act 1916 c. 46
 Local Government (Emergency Provisions) Act 1916 c. 12
 Local Government Emergency Provisions (No. 2) Act 1916 c. 55
 Marriage (Scotland) Act 1916 c. 7
 Marriage of British Subjects (Facilities) Amendment Act 1916 c. 21
 Merchant Shipping (Salvage) Act 1916 c. 41
 Military Service Act 1916 (Session 2) c. 15
 Ministry of Pensions Act 1916 c. 65
 Municipal Savings Banks (War Loan Investment) Act 1916 c. 47
 Munitions (Liability for Explosions) Act 1916 c. 61
 National Insurance (Part II.) (Munition Workers) Act 1916 c. 20
 National Insurance (Temporary Employment in Agriculture) Act 1916 c. 53
 Naval Discipline (Delegation of Powers) Act 1916 c. 17
 Naval Prize (Procedure) Act 1916 c. 2
 Naval and Military War Pensions, &c. (Expenses) Act 1916 c. 4
 New Ministries and Secretaries Act 1916 c. 68
 Output of Beer (Restriction) Act 1916 c. 26
 Output of Beer (Restriction) Amendment Act 1916 c. 57
 Pacific Islands Regulations (Validation) Act 1916 c. 9
 Parliament and Local Elections Act 1916 c. 44
 Police, Factories, &c. (Miscellaneous Provisions) Act 1916 c. 31
 Prevention of Corruption Act 1916 c. 64
 Public Authorities and Bodies (Loans) Act 1916 c. 69
 Public Works Loans Act 1916 c. 28
 Re-election of Ministers Act 1916 c. 22
 Re-election of Ministers (No. 2) Act 1916 c. 56
 Registration of Business Names Act 1916 c. 58
 Royal Marines Act 1916 c. 23
 Sailors and Soldiers (Gifts for Land Settlement) Act 1916 c. 60
 Small Holding Colonies Act 1916 c. 38
 Special Commissions (Dardanelles and Mesopotamia) Act 1916 c. 34
 Summer Time Act 1916 c. 14
 Telegraph (Construction) Act 1916 c. 40
 Time (Ireland) Act 1916 c. 45
 Trading with the Enemy (Copyright) Act 1916 c. 32
 Trading with the Enemy and Export of Prohibited Goods Act 1916 c. 52
 Volunteer Act 1916 c. 62
 War Charities Act 1916 c. 43
 War Loan Act 1916 c. 67
 War Risks (Insurance by Trustees) Act 1916 c. 6

1917 (7 & 8 Geo. 5)

 Air Force (Constitution) Act 1917 c. 51
 Appropriation Act 1917 c. 52
 Army (Annual) Act (1916) Amendment Act 1917 c. 10
 Army (Annual) Act 1917 c. 9
 Billeting of Civilians Act 1917 c. 20
 Bills of Exchange (Time of Noting) Act 1917 c. 48
 Census of Production Act 1917 c. 2
 Chequers Estate Act 1917 c. 55
 Coal Mines Regulation (Amendment) Act 1917 c. 8
 Companies (Foreign Interests) Act 1917 c. 18
 Companies (Particulars as to Directors) Act 1917 c. 28
 Confirmation of Executors (War Service) (Scotland) Act 1917 c. 27
 Consolidated Fund (No. 1) Act 1917 c. 1
 Consolidated Fund (No. 2) Act 1917 c. 7
 Consolidated Fund (No. 3) Act 1917 c. 17
 Consolidated Fund (No. 4) Act 1917 c. 33
 Consolidated Fund (No. 5) Act 1917 c. 49
 Corn Production Act 1917 c. 46
 Coroners (Emergency Provisions) Act 1917 c. 19
 Courts (Emergency Powers) Act 1917 c. 25
 Ecclesiastical Services (Omission on account of War) Act 1917 c. 5
 Education (Provision of Meals) (Ireland) Act 1917 c. 53
 Expiring Laws Continuance Act 1917 c. 38
 Finance Act 1917 c. 31
 Fishery Harbours (Continuance of Powers) Act 1917 c. 39
 Gaming Machines (Scotland) Act 1917 c. 23
 Grand Juries (Suspension) Act 1917 c. 4
 Isle of Man (Customs) Act 1917 c. 35
 Local Government (Allotments and Land Cultivation) (Ireland) Act 1917 c. 30
 Military Service (Conventions with Allied States) Act 1917 c. 26
 Military Service (Review of Exceptions) Act 1917 c. 12
 Ministry of National Service Act 1917 c. 6
 Munitions of War Act 1917 c. 45
 National Insurance (Part I. Amendment) Act 1917 c. 15
 Naval Discipline Act 1917 c. 34
 Naval Discipline (Delegation of Powers) Act 1917 c. 11
 Naval and Military War Pensions, &c. (Administrative Expenses) Act 1917 c. 14
 Naval and Military War Pensions, &c. (Committees) Act 1917 c. 54
 Naval and Military War Pensions, &c. (Transfer of Powers), Act 1917 c. 37
 New Ministries Act 1917 c. 44
 Parliament and Local Elections Act 1917 c. 13
 Parliament and Local Elections (No. 2) Act 1917 c. 50
 Police Constables (Naval and Military Service) Act 1917 c. 36
 Public Health (Prevention and Treatment of Disease) (Ireland) Act 1917 c. 40
 Public Works Loans Act 1917 c. 32
 Railway Passenger Duty Act 1917 c. 3
 Royal Naval Volunteer Reserve Act 1917 c. 22
 Societies (Suspension of Meetings) Act 1917 c. 16
 Solicitors (Examination) Act 1917 c. 43
 Titles Deprivation Act 1917 c. 47
 Trade Union (Amalgamation) Act 1917 c. 24
 Venereal Disease Act 1917 c. 21
 War Loan Act 1917 c. 41
 Wesleyan Methodists (Appointments during the War) Act 1917 c. 29
 Workmen's Compensation (War Addition) Act 1917 c. 42

1918

7 & 8 Geo. 5

 Bishoprics of Bradford and Coventry Act 1918 c. 57
 Coal Mines Control Agreement (Confirmation) Act 1918 c. 56
 Metropolitan Police Act 1918 c. 61
 Midwives (Ireland) Act 1918 c. 59
 Military Service Act 1918 c. 66
 National Health Insurance Act 1918 c. 62
 National Insurance (Unemployment) Act 1918 c. 63	
 National Registration (Amendment) Act 1918 c. 60	
 Non-Ferrous Metal Industry Act 1918 c. 67	
 Redistribution of Seats (Ireland) Act 1918 c. 65
 Representation of the People Act 1918 c. 64
 Wills (Soldiers and Sailors) Act 1918 c. 58

8 & 9 Geo. 5

 Affiliation Orders (Increase of Maximum Payment) Act 1918 c. 49
 Appropriation Act 1918 c. 56
 Army (Annual) Act 1918 c. 6
 Asylums and Certified Institutions (Officers Pensions) Act 1918 c. 33
 British Nationality and Status of Aliens Act 1918 c. 38
 Burghs Gas Supply (Scotland) Amendment Act 1918 c. 45
 Consolidated Fund (No. 1) Act 1918 c. 1
 Consolidated Fund (No. 2) Act 1918 c. 11
 Consolidated Fund (No. 3) Act 1918 c. 37
 Constabulary and Police (Ireland) Act 1918 c. 53
 Corn Production (Amendment) Act 1918 c. 36
 Defence of the Realm (Beans, Peas, and Pulse Orders) Act 1918 c. 12
 Defence of the Realm (Employment Exchanges) Act 1918 c. 58
 Defence of the Realm (Food Profits) Act 1918 c. 9
 Deputy Lieutenants Act 1918 c. 19
 Education Act 1918 c. 39
 Education (Scotland) Act 1918 c. 48
 Expiring Laws Continuance Act 1918 c. 21
 Finance Act 1918 c. 15
 Flax Companies (Financial Assistance) Act 1918 c. 24
 Government War Obligations Act 1918 c. 28
 Horse Breeding Act 1918 c. 13
 Income Tax Act 1918 c. 40
 Increase of Rent, &c. (Amendment) Act 1918 c. 7
 Isle of Man (Customs) Act 1918 c. 41
 Juries Act 1918 c. 23
 Labourers (Ireland) Act 1918 c. 20
 Land Drainage Act 1918 c. 17
 Loans (Incumbents of Benefices) Amendment Act 1918 c. 42
 Marriages (Ireland) Act 1918 c. 2
 Maternity and Child Welfare Act 1918 c. 29
 Midwives Act 1918 c. 43
 Military Service (No. 2) Act 1918 c. 5
 Ministry of Munitions Act 1918 c. 60
 Naval Prize Act 1918 c. 30
 Overseas Trade Department (Secretary) Act 1918 c. 3
 Parliament (Qualification of Women) Act 1918 c. 47
 Parliament and Local Elections Act 1918 c. 22
 Petroleum (Production) Act 1918 c. 52
 Police (Pensions) Act 1918 c. 51
 Post Office Act 1918 c. 10
 Public Health (Borrowing Powers) (Ireland) Act 1918 c. 35
 Public Works Loans Act 1918 c. 27
 Representation of the People (Amendment) Act 1918 c. 50
 School Teachers (Superannuation) Act 1918 c. 55
 Small Holding Colonies (Amendment) Act 1918 c. 26
 Solicitors (Articled Clerks) Act 1918 c. 16
 Special Commission (Belfast Prison) Act 1918 c. 44
 Statutory Undertakings (Temporary Increase of Charges) Act 1918 c. 34
 Stockbrokers (Ireland) Act 1918 c. 46
 Summary Jurisdiction (Ireland) Act 1918 c. 18
 Termination of the Present War (Definition) Act 1918 c. 59
 Tithe Act 1918 c. 54
 Trade Boards Act 1918 c. 32
 Trading with the Enemy (Amendment) Act 1918 c. 31
 Trustee Savings Banks Act 1918 c. 4
 Wages (Temporary Regulation) Act 1918 c. 61
 War Loan Act 1918 c. 25
 War Pensions (Administrative Provisions) Act 1918 c. 57
 Workmen's Compensation (Illegal Employment) Act 1918 c. 8
 Workmen's Compensation (Silicosis) Act 1918 c. 14

1919 (9 & 10 Geo. 5)
 Acquisition of Land (Assessment of Compensation) Act 1919 c. 57
 Agricultural Land Sales (Restriction of Notices to Quit) Act 1919 c. 63
 Air Navigation Act 1919 c. 3
 Aliens Restriction (Amendment) Act 1919 c. 92
 Anglo-French Treaty (Defence of France) Act 1919 c. 34
 Anglo-Persian Oil Company (Acquisition of Capital) Amendment Act 1919 c. 86
 Animals (Anæsthetics) Act 1919 c. 54
 Anthrax Prevention Act 1919 c. 23
 Appropriation Act 1919 c. 88
 Army (Annual) Act 1919 c. 11
 British Mercantile Marine Uniform Act 1919 c. 62
 Checkweighing in Various Industries Act 1919 c. 51
 Church of England Assembly (Powers) Act 1919 c. 76
 Civil Contingencies Fund Act 1919 c. 6
 Coal Industry Commission Act 1919 c. 1
 Coal Mines Act 1919 c. 48
 Consolidated Fund (No. 1) Act 1919 c. 5
 Consolidated Fund (No. 2) Act 1919 c. 49
 Constabulary and Police (Ireland) Act 1919 c. 68
 County and Borough Police Act 1919 c. 84
 County Courts Act 1919 c. 73
 County Court Judges (Retirement Pensions and Deputies) Act 1919 c. 70
 Courts (Emergency Powers) Act 1919 c. 64
 Criminal Injuries (Ireland) Act 1919 c. 14
 Disabled Men (Facilities for Employment) Act 1919 c. 22
 Dogs Regulation (Ireland) Act 1919 c. 81
 Education (Compliance with Conditions of Grants) Act 1919 c. 41
 Education (Scotland) (Superannuation) Act 1919 c. 17
 Electricity (Supply) Act 1919 c. 100
 Expiring Laws Continuance Act 1919 c. 39
 Ferries (Acquisition by Local Authorities) Act 1919 c. 75
 Finance Act 1919 c. 32
 Forestry Act 1919 c. 58
 Government of India Act 1919 c. 101
 Government of the Soudan Loan Act 1919 c. 43
 Government War Obligations Act 1919 c. 44
 Grant of Administration (Bonds) Act 1919 c. 26
 Housing (Additional Powers) Act 1919 c. 99
 Housing (Ireland) Act 1919 c. 45
 Housing, Town Planning, &c. Act 1919 c. 35
 Housing, Town Planning, etc. (Scotland) Act 1919 c. 60
 Increase of Rent and Mortgage Interest (Restrictions) Act 1919 c. 7
 Increase of Rent, &c. (Amendment) Act 1919 c. 90
 Industrial Courts Act 1919 c. 69
 Intestate Husband’s Estate (Scotland) Act 1919 c. 9
 Intestate Moveable Succession (Scotland) Act 1919 c.61
 Irish Land (Provision for Sailors and Soldiers) Act 1919 c. 82
 Irish Railways (Confirmation of Agreement) Act 1919 c. 78
 Isle of Man (Customs) Act 1919 c. 74
 Labourers (Ireland) Act 1919 c. 55
 Land Settlement (Facilities) Act 1919 c. 59
 Land Settlement (Scotland) Act 1919 c. 97
 Law Agents Apprenticeship (War Service) (Scotland) Act 1919 c. 24
 Local Elections (Expenses) Act 1919 c. 13
 Local Government (Ireland) Act 1919 c. 19
 Matrimonial Causes (Dominions Troops) Act 1919 c. 28
 Mental Deficiency and Lunacy (Amendment) Act 1919 c. 85
 Merchant Shipping (Wireless Telegraphy) Act 1919 c. 38
 Ministry of Agriculture and Fisheries Act 1919 c. 91
 Ministry of Health Act 1919 c. 21
 Ministry of Transport Act 1919 c. 50
 National Health Insurance Act 1919 c. 36
 National Insurance (Unemployment) Act 1919 c. 77
 Naval, Military and Air Force Service Act 1919 c. 15
 Nurses Registration Act 1919 c. 94
 Nurses Registration (Ireland) Act 1919 c. 96
 Nurses Registration (Scotland) Act 1919 c.95
 Official Solicitor Act 1919 c. 30
 Old Age Pensions Act 1919 c. 102
 Parliamentary Elections (Soldiers) Act 1919 c. 10
 Patents and Designs Act 1919 c. 80
 Police Act 1919 c. 46
 Profiteering Act 1919 c. 66
 Profiteering (Continuance) Act 1919 c. 87
 Public Health (Medical Treatment of Children) (Ireland) Act 1919 c. 16
 Public Libraries Act 1919 c. 93
 Public Notaries (Articled Clerks) Act 1919 c. 25
 Public Works Loans Act 1919 c. 52
 Rats and Mice (Destruction) Act 1919 c. 72
 Re-election of Ministers Act 1919 c. 2
 Regimental Debts (Deposit of Wills) (Scotland) Act 1919 c.89
 Representation of the People (Returning Officers' Expenses) Act 1919 c. 8
 Restoration of Pre-War Practices Act 1919 c. 42
 Retired Officers (Civil Employment) Act 1919 c. 40
 Scottish Board of Health Act 1919 c.20
 Sex Disqualification (Removal) Act 1919 c. 71
 Solicitors Act 1919 c. 56
 Solicitors (Articled Clerks) Act 1919 c. 27
 Statement of Rates Act 1919 c. 31
 Summons and Process Servers' Fees (Ireland) Act 1919 c. 4
 Superannuation (Prison Officers) Act 1919 c. 67
 Trade Marks Act 1919 c. 79
 Treaty of Peace Act 1919 c. 33
 Union of Benefices Act 1919 c. 98
 Wages (Temporary Regulation) Extension Act 1919 c. 18
 War Charities (Scotland) Act 1919 c. 12
 War Loan Act 1919 c. 37
 War Pensions (Administrative Provisions) Act 1919 c. 53
 Weights and Measures (Leather Measurement) Act 1919 c. 29
 Welsh Church (Temporalities) Act 1919 c. 65
 West Indian Court of Appeal Act 1919 c. 47
 Workmen's Compensation (War Addition) Amendment Act 1919 c. 83

See also
List of Acts of the Parliament of the United Kingdom

External links
- Volume 38 - 63 and 63 & 64 Victoria - 1900
- Volume 39 - 64 Victoria & 1 Edward VII - 1901
- Volume 40 - 2 Edward VII - 1902
- Volume 41 - 3 Edward VII - 1903
- Volume 42 - 4 Edward VII - 1904
- 5 Edward VII - 1905
- Volume 44 - 6 Edward VII - 1906
- Volume 45 - 7 Edward VII - 1907
- Volume 46 - 8 Edward VII - 1908
- 9 Edward VII - 1909
- 10 Edward VII & 1 George V - 1910
- 2 & 3 George V - 1912-13
- 3 & 4 George V - 1913
- 4 & 5 George V - 1914
- 5 & 6 George V - 1914-6
- 6 & 7 George V - 1916
- 7 & 8 George V - 1917-8
- 8 & 9 George V - 1918
- 9 & 10 George V - 1919

1900
1900s in the United Kingdom
1910s in the United Kingdom